Igor Lovchinsky (born December 15, 1984) is a Russian-American pianist and physicist.

Performing and recording career
Born in Kazan, then part of the Soviet Union, Lovchinsky began his musical career at the Kazan Special Music School for Gifted Children. After immigrating to the United States with his family in 1994, Lovchinsky continued his studies with renowned pedagogues Nina Polonsky and Steven Glaser. In 2003, Lovchinsky entered the Juilliard School in New York on full scholarship, where he studied under Jerome Lowenthal. He received a Bachelor's degree from Juilliard in 2007 and a Master's degree from the New England Conservatory in Boston in 2009.

As soloist, Igor Lovchinsky has performed at some of the major concert halls in the United States, including concerts at the John F. Kennedy Center for the Performing Arts, Carnegie Hall’s Weill Recital Auditorium, Hilbert Circle Theatre, the Bushnell Center for the Performing Arts, the Eastman Theatre and the Ohio Theatre. Internationally, he has presented recitals at the National Philharmonic Hall in Warsaw, the American Embassy in Beijing, and the Rosza Centre in Calgary.  Recent international tours have included performances in Lithuania, Poland and Brazil.

Mr. Lovchinsky has performed as soloist with the Indianapolis Symphony Orchestra, the Indianapolis Chamber Orchestra, the Columbus Symphony Orchestra, the Live Music Project Ensemble, the Florida International University Symphony Orchestra, and others. In addition, his performance of Chopin's First Concerto with the Connecticut Virtuosi Chamber Orchestra was broadcast on WQXR radio in New York and was featured as the soundtrack of the independent film "Romance Larghetto" by director Pablo Goldbarg. In 2007, in collaboration with American pianist Earl Wild, Lovchinsky recorded his debut album on the Ivory Classics label, featuring music of Chopin, Scriabin and Wild's transcriptions of Gershwin songs.  The disc received rave reviews from Gramophone Magazine, Germany's Piano Magazine, MusicWeb International Record Review and was voted one of top five classical recordings of 2008 by Time Out International.

An avid exponent of new music, Mr. Lovchinsky has premiered works of Olivier Messiaen, Heather Schmidt and Frank Felice.

Awards
Lovchinsky was a laureate of the National Chopin Piano Competition and the Eastman International Piano Competition.

Physics
In addition to music, Mr. Lovchinsky holds a Ph.D. in Physics from Harvard University where his doctoral advisor was Mikhail Lukin. He has published numerous scientific articles in nanoscale metrology, quantum information science and high-energy astrophysics in leading scientific journals.

Personal life
As of 2012, Lovchinsky is married to neuroscientist Alice Wang.

References

http://www.lovchinsky.com/
https://web.archive.org/web/20081015030641/http://www.esm.rochester.edu/pianocomp/

http://www.elpaso-chopin.com/Lovchinsky.htm
http://www.hamptons.com/detail.ihtml?id=5078
http://www.kosciuszkofoundation.org/EV_May04_23.html
http://www.ivoryclassics.com/

Russian classical pianists
Male classical pianists
1984 births
Living people
Musicians from Kazan
21st-century classical pianists
Juilliard School alumni
New England Conservatory alumni
Harvard University alumni
21st-century Russian male musicians
Scientists from Kazan